Oliver S. Marshall (September 24, 1850 – May 19, 1934) was an American politician serving as a member of the West Virginia Senate from 1st District in three terms from 1897 to 1901, 1905 to 1909, and 1913 to 1917. A member of the Republican Party, he served as President of the Senate from 1899 to 1901.

Biography
Oliver S. Marshall was born in Fairview, now New Manchester, West Virginia on September 24, 1850, to James G. and Lavinia Miller Marshall. He was the great grandson of Aaron Marshall, a pioneer settler about 1760 of what is now Hancock County, West Virginia. He attended West Liberty Normal School and graduated from Bethany College in 1878. He married Elizabeth Tarr on September 8, 1880; they had two children, John and Olive. After the death of Elizabeth, he married Nora Householder in 1890, and they had three children: Edith, Edmond, and Virginia.

In 1896, Oliver S. Marshall was elected to the West Virginia State Senate from the First Senatorial District. In 1892, Marshall served as a delegate to the Republican National Convention. He served as President of the West Virginia State Senate for the 1899 session. During his term he presided over Senate proceedings that led to the passage of bills that incorporated West Virginia banks and savings institutions, established a procedure for West Virginia public institutions to report to the Legislature, and reorganized the process for the Legislature to consider appropriations bills. He was reelected to the Senate in 1904 and 1912.

Marshall died at his home in New Cumberland on May 19, 1934.

Legacy
His house at New Cumberland, West Virginia was listed on the National Register of Historic Places in 2001.

References

Republican Party West Virginia state senators
Presidents of the West Virginia State Senate
1850 births
1934 deaths
Bethany College (West Virginia) alumni